This is a list of Estonian television related events from 2006.

Events
4 February - Sandra Oxenryd is selected to represent Estonia at the 2006 Eurovision Song Contest with her song "Through My Window". She is selected to be the twelfth Estonian Eurovision entry during Eurolaul held at the ETV Studios in Tallinn.

Debuts

Television shows

1990s
Õnne 13 (1993–present)

Ending this year

Births

Deaths
9 January – Mikk Mikiver (born 1937), actor, director 
4 November – Dajan Ahmet (born 1962), actor